Harris Williams is an American multinational independent investment bank and financial services company specializing in advisory services and financing for middle-market companies. The firm provides a variety of advisory services including mergers & acquisitions, fairness opinions and restructuring advisory.  Harris Williams operates as a subsidiary of PNC Financial Services.

The firm, which is based in Richmond, Virginia, was founded in 1991.  The company operates additional offices in San Francisco, Boston, Minneapolis, Cleveland, Washington DC., London, and Frankfurt. The chief operating officer is Paul Poggi.

History
Harris Williams was founded by Christopher Williams and Hiter Harris, who previously worked together at Charlotte investment banking boutique Bowles Hollowell Conner & Co., a firm later bought by Wachovia.  Harris and Williams had previously been classmates at Harvard Business School, from which they graduated in 1987.

The firm has built its business focused heavily on providing advisory services for leveraged buyout transactions and other private equity investments.

In 2005, Harris Williams was acquired by PNC Financial Services and continues to operate as a subsidiary of PNC under the Harris Williams brand.

See also
PNC Financial Services

References

Harris Williams & Co. Named Middle Market Investment Bank of the Year.  Investment Dealers' Digest, January 21, 2008

External links
Harris Williams (company website)

Investment banks in the United States
American companies established in 1991
Financial services companies established in 1991
Banks established in 1991
Companies based in Richmond, Virginia
1991 establishments in Virginia
2005 mergers and acquisitions